Pak, Kyongni or Bak, Kyoungli (October 28, 1926 – May 5, 2008) was a prominent South Korean novelist. She was born in Tōei, Keishōnan-dō, Chōsen (today Tongyeong, South Gyeongsang Province, South Korea); later she lived in Wonju, Gangwon Province. Bak made her literary debut in 1955, with Gyesan (계산, Calculations). She is, however, most well known for her 20-volume story Toji (토지, The Land), an epic saga set on the turbulent history of Korea during 19th and 20th century. It was later adapted into a movie, a television series and an opera.  Toji is regarded as one of the greatest contributions to Korean literature.

Bak, Kyoungli died from lung cancer at the age of 81 on May 5, 2008 and many literary writers recollected her as a guide for their literary works and life as a writer. She was posthumously awarded the country's top medal by the newly created Culture Ministry of South Korea for her promoting South Korean arts.

Life
Bak, Kyoungli was born as the first daughter to a middle-class family in 1926 in Tōei, Keishōnan-dō. Her birth name was Bak, Geum-i (박금이).  Her parents married when her mother was eighteen and her father, Bak, Soo-young (박수영), fourteen. The relationship between her parents did not go well, which deeply affected her life. Her problems started when her father left her mother immediately after her birth. Later, she said that she had both sympathy and contempt toward her mother, but hatred against her father. Her response was to  isolate herself in an imaginary world centered around her books.

However, her problems did not end with her marriage. Her husband was accused of being a communist, then went missing during the Korean War and eventually died in Seodaemun Prison. She lost her 3 year-old baby son in the same year. As a widow, she provided the sole financial support for her daughter and mother. 

She began her career as a professional writer in 1955 after a recommendation by the novelist and poet, Kim Tong-ni (김동리). She underwent surgery for breast cancer in the 1960s and had to raise her grandson, Wonbo, after her son-in-law and poet, Kim Ji-ha (김지하) was arrested for allegedly being a communist in the 1970s. She later suffered from lung cancer.

Work
When she debuted, she said "If I had been happy, I would have not begun writing." She also said later, "I live with my mother and daughter and had to support them financially by myself. I began writing since I had hope to get away from my adversity."
Her difficult personal life surely influenced her works, where she emphasized human dignity.

She started her career as a writer with the novel, Calculations (계산, Gyesan) and her early work was heavily influenced by her personal circumstances. The narrators in her novels like Time of Distrust (불신 시대, Boolsin Sidae) and Time of Darkness (암흑 시대, Amheuk Sidae) are often  women living with their mothers who lost a husband and son, reflecting her own life. In her later work, The Daughters of Pharmacist Kim (김 약국의 딸들, Kimyakgukui Ddaldeul), she emphasizes characters who overcome their difficulties. Later, her point of view became more objective in that her fictional setting moved from the Korean war period to everyday life; employing more varied styles and topics.

Toji (The Land)
Toji (The Land) is the most famous of her novels. It took her 25 years to write. Its theme is the turbulence at the turn of the 20th century when the Korean people were struggling against Japanese imperialism and has hundreds of characters from across the Korean peninsula; following them from the late 19th century to the early 20th century through Japan’s colonial rule to the division of the peninsula. "Kim, Gilsang" (김길상) and "Choi, Seohee" (최서희), the main protagonists of the novel, like those in her other novels, struggle to save their own dignity in the most turbulent period of Korean history. It employs native folk language and diverse character portrayals, depicting Korea’s modern history through the love of a vast "Mother Earth".  

It has been made into a TV series, a movie, and an opera. It has also been translated into several languages including English, German, French and Japanese as well as being included in the UNESCO Collection of Representative Works.

She opened the "Toji Cultural Center" on the site of her original home in Wonju, Gangwon Province, in 1999, to help nurture new writers. She also served as a chairperson of the board of trustees of the "", which was established in 1996.

Works

In Korean
 1955 Calculation (계산, Gyesan)
 1956 Black and Black and White and White (흑흑백백, Heukheuk baekbaek)
 1957 Period of Distrust (불신 시대, Boolsin Sidae)
 1957 Missions
 1958 Love Song (연가, Yeonga )
 1958 Byeokji (벽지)
 1958 Time of Darkness (암흑 시대, Amheuk Sidae)
 1959 Pyoryudo (표류도)
 1962 The Daughters of Pharmacist Kim (김 약국의 딸들, Kim Yakgukui Ttaldeul)
 1963 Pasi (파시)
 1965 The Market and War field (시장과 전장, Sijang gwa Jeonjang)
 1965 Green Zone (Nokjidae, 녹지대)
 1969–1994 Toji (토지 The Land)
 My Mind is Lake (내 마음은 호수)
 Blue Galaxy (푸른 은하)

In translation
 Land 1 (토지 1)
 Land 2 (토지 2)
 Land 3 (토지 3)
 Land 4 (토지 4)
 Markt und Krieg (시장과 전장)
 Дочери аптекаря Кима (김 약국의 딸들)
 The Curse of Kim's Daughters (김 약국의 딸들)
 土地 第一部 第二卷 (토지 1)
 土地 第一部 第二卷 (토지 2)
 土地 第一部 第三卷 (토지 3)
 金药局家的女儿们 (김 약국의 딸들)
 La Terre (토지)
 Les filles du Pharmacien Kim (김 약국의 딸들)

Awards
The Woltan Literature Award (for Land).
 Contemporary Literature (Hyundae Munhak) Award (1958)
The Inchon Award
Korean Women's Literature Award
The Bogwan'' Order of Cultural Merit (awarded 1992).
Order of Cultural Merit, Geum-gwan Medal (Gold Crown) 금관장 (awarded posthumously).

Legacy
On June 20, 2018, the first monument to the Korean cultural figure Park Kenny abroad, outside of Korea, was erected in Saint Petersburg.

Notes

References

1926 births
2008 deaths
South Korean Roman Catholics
South Korean novelists
20th-century South Korean poets
Deaths from lung cancer
Recipients of the Order of Cultural Merit (Korea)
South Korean women poets
20th-century novelists
20th-century women writers